Joan Newell (1915–2012) was a British actress primarily known for her television roles, but who also appeared in films and on stage. She co-starred with John Slater in the 1953 series Johnny, You're Wanted. Amongst her most prominent later roles was that of Meg Owen in the series The Doctors and its spinoff Owen, M.D..

Selected filmography

Film
 It's Hard to Be Good (1948)
 To Dorothy a Son (1954)
 The Last Man to Hang (1956)
 The Devil's Pass (1957)
 Jigsaw (1962)
 Stolen Hours (1963)
 Live It Up! (1963)
 Keep It Up Downstairs (1976)

Television
 Johnny, You're Wanted (1953)
 Dixon of Dock Green (1956–65)
 Emergency-Ward 10 (1959–66)
 The Citadel (1960–61)
 The Escape of R.D.7 (1961)
 Dr. Finlay's Casebook (1962)
 Harpers West One (1963)
 Steptoe and Son (1963–65)
 No Hiding Place (1964)
 The Sullavan Brothers (1964)
 Danger Man (1965)
 The Newcomers (1965–66)
 Sergeant Cork (1966)
 Mrs Thursday (1966–67)
 Further Adventures of Lucky Jim (1967)
 The Saint (1968)
 Journey to the Unknown (1969)
 Parkin's Patch (1969)
 Strange Report (1969)
 Hadleigh (1969)
 The Doctors (1970–71)
 Owen, M.D. (1971–72)
 Country Matters (1972)
 Crown Court (1973)
 The Kids from 47A (1973–74)
 The Cedar Tree (1976–77)
 Juliet Bravo (1980)
 Terry and June (1981)

References

Bibliography
Baskin, Ellen . Serials on British Television, 1950–1994. Scolar Press, 1996.
 Perry, Chris. The Kaleidoscope British Christmas Television Guide 1937–2013. 2017.
 Wearing, J.P. The London Stage 1950–1959: A Calendar of Productions, Performers, and Personnel.  Rowman & Littlefield, 2014.

External links

1915 births
2012 deaths
People from  Steyning
British film actresses
British stage actresses
British television actresses